FTP, the File Transfer Protocol, is a standard network protocol.

FTP may also refer to:

Arts and entertainment 
 Free-to-play, a video game business model
 "F.T.P.", a song from the album Xodus by X Clan

Technology 
 Foiled twisted pair
 FTP Software, a former US company
 International Workshop on First-Order Theorem Proving

Other uses 
 Faulkes Telescope Project
 Federal Theatre Project, a 1930s U.S. theatre program
 Field training program
 Francs-Tireurs et Partisans (FTP), a French WWII Resistance movement
 Funds transfer pricing
 ICC Future Tours Programme, an international cricket schedule
 A streetwear brand based in Los Angeles, California; see 
 Functional Threshold Power, the amount of power produced by a cyclist at lactate threshold
 Fuck the Police (disambiguation)